LaSalle College (French: Collège LaSalle) was founded in 1959 by fashion designer Jean-Paul Morin. The college offers over 60 pre-university, technical and professional programs and is the largest bilingual college in North America. Fashion, arts and design, hotel management and tourism, business and technology, social sciences and education, VFX and game design, and e-learning are the six schools that comprise the college.

History

LaSalle College was founded in 1959 by Jean-Paul Morin, who is often referred to as "the father of fashion design in Quebec." His goal was to give the Quebec population, at the time, new career opportunities by receiving education directly from experts. The first program offered was a secretarial course.

Timeline

1959:	Founder, Jean-Paul Morin opens LaSalle Commercial College in Ville LaSalle and offers secretarial training.
1963:	Jean-Paul Morin sets a trend by taking initiative: his college is the first to hold an "open house," to print a color ad in Quebec, and do television advertising.
1966:	Designed by professors of the Fashion Institute of Technology of New York, LaSalle College launches its Fashion Marketing program.
1970:	A placement service is put in place for graduates of LaSalle College.
1971:	In collaboration with the Hotel Sheraton, LaSalle College launches its Hotel Management program.
1973:	LaSalle College receives the status of "collegial establishment" from the ministère de l’Éducation du Québec.
	L’Ecole de mode du LaSalle College is born. The three-year Fashion Design program is launched whereby graduates receive a diploma of collegial studies (DEC)
1978: 	The ministère de l’ Éducation du Québec recognizes LaSalle College as the "Centre specialisé de la mode"
1979: Mr. Jacques Marchand joins LaSalle College. 
1983:	College Inter-Dec opens, offering programs in aesthetics and computer science.
1988:	Jean-Paul Morin retires.
1988: Mrs Jacques Marchand and Jacques Lefebvre acquire the college.
1989:	The first LaSalle College International opens in Casablanca, Morocco.
1989: The Fondation de la Mode de Montréal is created to support training and research in the fashion industry.
1995:	l’École supérieure de mode de Montréal (ÉSMM) is created in partnership with l’Université de Québec à Montréal offering a bachelor's degree in fashion design and management
1996:	The resto-bar Le Fuchsia opens and acts as a laboratory for the International School of Hotel Management and Tourism.
1996:	The Montréal International Language Centre (MILC) is created, providing courses in English and French as a second language, alongside seven other foreign languages.
1998:	LaSalle College International opens in Vancouver, BC.
2000:	 LaSalle College opens an e-learning school and invests in developing online learning solutions.
2010:	UXIBUS is launched, a website for graduates to showcase their work, search for jobs and where employers can browse through profiles to find potential candidates.
2014:	After 25 years, LaSalle College changes its image and logo.
2014:	Claude Marchand becomes CEO of LCI Education.
2017: LCI Education network acquires The Art Institute of Vancouver which continues as LaSalle College Vancouver, in Vancouver, Canada.

Schools

LaSalle College has six schools under its banner, each specializing in their respective industries:

International School of Fashion, Arts and Design
International School of Hotel Management and Tourism
School of Social Sciences and Education
International School of Business and Technologies
School of VFX & Game Design
School of E-learning

Programs
The college is part of the Quebec educational system and grants 3 types of diplomas:

Pre-university and technical programs – DEC: A diploma of college studies (DEC) can either give a student access to university or the job market.
Continuing education and technical programs – AEC:  An attestation of college studies (AEC) serves to reorient one's career or quickly acquire a skill set applicable in the job market.
Vocational training – DVS: A diploma of vocational studies (DVS or DEP in French) is a diploma that prepares students for direct employment.

Awards and recognition 

 In 2013, New York-based fashion blog Fashionista.com ranked LaSalle College #33 out of the "Top 50 Fashion Schools in the World."
 In 2014, LaSalle College students earned 4 out of the 5 prizes awarded at the Télio Design Competition (A Quebec-based, wholesale textiles distributor).

Notable alumni 

 Denis Gagnon (Montreal fashion designer)
 Travis Taddeo (Canadian fashion designer)
 Anastasia Radevich (Montreal avant-garde fashion designer)
 Mariouche Gagné (Canadian Indigenous fashion designer)
 Annie Horth (Montreal fashion designer)
 Thomas Tait (Award-winning fashion designer)
 Mike Derderian and Gianni Falcone (Canadian fashion-brand partners)

See also
 List of colleges in Quebec
 Higher education in Quebec
 Canadian Inter-university Sport
 Canadian government scientific research organizations
 Canadian university scientific research organizations
 Canadian industrial research and development organizations

References

Vocational education in Canada
Universities and colleges in Montreal
Colleges in Quebec
Educational institutions established in 1959
1959 establishments in Quebec
Private universities and colleges in Canada